Yankee Transcendoodle is an album by Joseph Byrd of patriotic music where all the sounds are produced by synthesizer. The album was released in 1976 on Takoma Records.

Track listing 

 The Star-Spangled Banner
 The Yankee Doodle Boy
 Tramp! Tramp! Tramp!
 The Red, White and Blue (Columbia, the Gem of the Ocean)
 Hail, Columbia
 America the Beautiful
 Hold the Fort (Philip Bliss, 1870)
 John Brown's Body (The Battle Hymn of the Republic)
 Battle Cry of Freedom (Rally Round the Flag)
 National Emblem
 Wake Nicodemus! (Henry Clay Work, 1864)
 The World Turned Upside Down
 Chester
 The Washington Post
 You're a Grand Old Flag
 The Bonnie Blue Flag / Dixie
 Kingdom Coming
 Home! Sweet Home!
 Conquest of the American Wilderness (Joseph Byrd)
 The Stars and Stripes Forever
 Grand Centennial Hymn
 Lilly Bell Quickstep (G.W.E. Friederich, 1854)

Credits
 Charel Morris - Producer and Mixing Engineer
 Douglas Decker - Mixing Engineer 
 Garry Margolis - Photography
 John Bucchino - Keyboards
Jon Monday - Producer
Joseph Byrd - Synthesizer, Keyboards, arranger
 Theresa Abramian - Artwork

References

1976 albums
Joseph Byrd albums